Mahinabad may refer to:
 Mahinabad, Hamadan
 Mahinabad, Kerman